Picún Leufú is a second category municipality and the capital of Picún Leufú Department located in Neuquén Province, Argentina.

History
Picún Leufú was established on September 12, 1971.

Culture
The name of the town comes from Mapudungun and it means North River.

Populated places in Neuquén Province